Non Nước Bridge is a concrete bridge on Highway 10, Vietnam (vi), built in 1995 over the River Đáy between Ninh Bình town, capital of Ninh Bình Province, and Ý Yên District, Nam Định Province. There was also a railway bridge.

References

Road bridges in Vietnam
Buildings and structures in Ninh Bình province
Buildings and structures in Nam Định province
Bridges completed in 2002